The Ohio-Kentucky-Indiana Regional Council of Governments (OKI) is a council of governments in the Cincinnati metropolitan area. It also serves as the region's official metropolitan planning organization.

External links

 

Metropolitan planning organizations
Councils of governments
Cincinnati metropolitan area
Organizations established in 1964
Local government in Ohio
Local government in Kentucky
Local government in Indiana